The men's high jump at the 2013 IPC Athletics World Championships was held at the Stade du Rhône from 20–29 July.

Medalists

See also
List of IPC world records in athletics

References

high jump
High jump at the World Para Athletics Championships